Devenish College is a secondary school located in Enniskillen, County Fermanagh, Northern Ireland. It lies within the Western Education Authority area.

Construction has now, however, started on the new build, due to be completed by November 2021. It is expected to cost £23.4m.

Notable former pupils

 Roy Carroll (Derby County  and former Northern Ireland & Manchester United  goalkeeper)
 Kyle Lafferty (Northern Ireland and Rangers F.C. striker)

References 

 New Devenish College
 Principal for Devenish College
 BBC News - School rebuild plans in jeopardy

External links 
 

Secondary schools in County Fermanagh
Enniskillen

2004 establishments in Northern Ireland
Educational institutions established in 2004